Diplosolenodes is a genus of air-breathing land slugs, terrestrial pulmonate gastropod mollusks in the family Veronicellidae, the leatherleaf slugs.

Species
Species within the genus Diplosolenodes include:
 Diplosolenodes attenuatus
 Diplosolenodes occidentalis

References

 Ref to main paper

Veronicellidae